Growing is the second studio album by Sleeping People, released on October 9, 2007. The final track, "People Staying Awake", is the only Sleeping People track to feature vocals, which are provided by Joileah Thalmann and Rob Crow from Pinback.

Track listing
 "Centipede's Dream" (Joileah Maddock) - 1:24
 "James Spader" - 7:03
 "Yellow Guy / Pink Eye" - 4:27
 "Mouth Breeder" - 8:53
 "...Out Dream" (Kenseth Thibideau) - 2:51
 "Three Things" - 6:09
 "Grow Worm" - 4:19
 "Underland" (Brandon Relf) - 3:22
 "It's Heart Loves Open" (Kasey Boekholt) - 1:55
 "People Staying Awake" (lyrics: Rob Crow) - 6:30

References

2007 albums
Sleeping People albums